Vallalar Nagar is a neighbourhood in Chennai, India. 
Vallalar nagar is one of the important place in North Chennai. It is also called popularly as Mint, since the Madras treasury and mint was located here. The nearest railway station is Washermanpet railway station.

Neighbourhoods in Chennai